"Mujh Se Pehli Si Mohabbat Mere Mehboob Na Maang" (translated as "My love, don’t ask me for the love I once gave you") is an Urdu nazm by Faiz Ahmad Faiz. The song is popular through its rendition by singer Noor Jehan and has been notably performed by many others. According to Faiz, the nazm also marks his transition from romantic work of his earlier years to mature works of his later years.

History 
The poem appeared in his first collection of poetry Naqsh-e-Fariyadi, published in 1943. Faiz belonged to the Progressive Writers’ Movement and "Mujhe Se Pehli Si Mohabbat Mere Mehboob Na Maang" marks his transition from ‘traditional Urdu poetry, to poetry with purpose’.

Themes 
The poet entreats his beloved not to ask of him the love that he once had for her because he has witnessed oppression, violence and death. He tells her that while she still enchants him, he can no longer love her with the same intensity as he cannot turn his gaze away from the brutal realities of society built on inequality and injustice. The poem contrasts and maintains a tension between the disembodied love of beauty and the ugly reality of social disparity and oppression. However, it has been noted that the poetic subject remains a reluctant revolutionary who merely views the scenes of social oppression, immobilized by his beloved’s gaze. The poem signals Faiz’s evolution from romantic poetry towards poems that deal with social concerns and has been compared to W. B. Yeats’ poem "Sailing to Byzantium". Faiz himself described it as 'the boundary' between his early romantic work and the mature works of his later years.

In popular culture 
The nazm was originally set to music and sung by Noor Jehan at the request of Faiz himself at a gathering held to celebrate his release from prison. It was also set to music for the film Qaidi in 1962. Noor Jehan’s rendition of the poem became famous and Faiz is said to have remarked that the poem no longer belonged to him but to Noor Jehan. The poem was parodied by Khalid Akhtar in his novel Bees Sau Gyarah (1950). A line from the poem, "Teri aankhon ke siva duniya mein rakha kya hai", was used by Majrooh Sultanpuri as the opening verse of a song in the Hindi film Chirag (1969). Sahir Ludhianvi’s song "Tum mujhe bhool bhi jaao to yeh haq hai tumko" (1959 Bollywood film Didi) is noted for its similarity of theme with this poem. The song featured in Episode 03 of Season 10 of Coke Studio Pakistan and was sung by Humaira Channa and Nabeel Shaukat Ali as a tribute Noor Jehan. Zohra Sehgal’s reading of it for the 2012 documentary Zohra Sehgal: An Interview by M. K. Raina went viral on the internet. The 2016 Hindi film Ae Dil Hai Mushkil featured an extract from the nazm.

References

Urdu-language literature
Poetry by Faiz Ahmad Faiz